"Get Low" is a song by American rapper Waka Flocka Flame, released on June 5, 2012 as the third single from his second studio album, Triple F Life: Fans, Friends & Family (2012). The song was produced by DJ Speedy and Breyan Issac. It features verses from rappers Nicki Minaj and Tyga. The chorus is sung by Flo Rida.

Music video
The music video was filmed on July 23, 2012 in Atlanta, Georgia and was directed by Benny Boom. The video features a cameo appearance from southern rapper Gucci Mane. The music video premiered on 106 & Park on August 31, 2012.  Flo Rida does not appear in the video.

Charts

References 

2012 songs
2012 singles
Waka Flocka Flame songs
Nicki Minaj songs
Flo Rida songs
Tyga songs
Song recordings produced by Boi-1da
Songs written by Nicki Minaj
Music videos directed by Benny Boom
Songs written by Flo Rida
Songs written by Tyga
Songs written by Boi-1da
Songs written by Waka Flocka Flame
Warner Records singles
Asylum Records singles